Shawn Harvey (born December 31, 1973 in Philadelphia, Pennsylvania) is an American professional basketball player from Essex County Community College and West Virginia State University. He is a 6'4" (1.93 m) and 180 lb (82 kg) shooting guard. Harvey was drafted by the National Basketball Association's Dallas Mavericks in the second round (#34 pick overall) of the 1996 NBA Draft, but he was later released. He was also selected by Florida Beachdogs in second round (#20 pick overall) of 1996 CBA Draft. 

He played for the Yakima Sun Kings in the Continental Basketball Association.

External links
TheDraftReview.com
MyBestPlay.com

1973 births
Living people
American men's basketball players
Basketball players from Philadelphia
Dallas Mavericks draft picks
Essex County College alumni
Junior college men's basketball players in the United States
Richmond Rhythm players
Shooting guards
West Virginia State Yellow Jackets men's basketball players
Yakima Sun Kings players
American expatriate basketball people in the Philippines
Philippine Basketball Association imports
Pop Cola Panthers players